The 2018 Colorado Buffaloes football team represented the University of Colorado in the Pac-12 Conference during the 2018 NCAA Division I FBS football season. Led by sixth-year head coach Mike MacIntyre, the Buffaloes played their home games on campus at Folsom Field in Boulder and finished at 5–7 (2–7 in Pac-12, last in South Division).

Despite a promising 5–0 start and a top twenty ranking, the Buffaloes lost their final seven games. The low point came during homecoming on October 27, when Colorado blew a 31–3 third-quarter lead to struggling Oregon State and lost by seven in overtime. MacIntyre was fired on November 18, the day after the sixth consecutive setback, a 30–7 home loss to rival Utah.

Mel Tucker, the defensive coordinator at Georgia, was hired as head coach in early December.

Previous season
Colorado finished the 2017 season at 5–7 (2–7 in Pac-12, last in the South Division).

Recruiting

Position Key

Recruits
The Buffaloes signed a total of 21 recruits.

Preseason

Award watch lists
Listed in the order that they were released

Pac-12 Media Days
The 2018 Pac-12 media days are set for July 25, 2018 in Hollywood, California. Mike MacIntyre (HC), Rick Gamboa (LB) & Steven Montez (QB) at Pac-12 Media Days. The Pac-12 media poll was released with the Buffaloes predicted to finish in fifth place at Pac-12 South division.

Schedule

Personnel

Coaching staff

Roster

Game summaries

vs. Colorado State

at Nebraska

New Hampshire

UCLA

Arizona State

at USC

at Washington

Oregon State

at Arizona

Washington State

Utah

at California

Rankings

Players drafted into the NFL

References

Colorado
Colorado Buffaloes football seasons
Colorado Buffaloes football